Walter is a German masculine given name derived from Old High German Walthari, composed of the elements walt- (Proto-Germanic *wald-) "power", "ruler", and hari (Proto-Germanic *χarja) "army".

The name was first popularized by the famous epic German hero Walther von Aquitaine and later with the writer Walther von der Vogelweide.

The name is first recorded in the 6th century, with Walthari son of Wacho, who was king of the Lombards during 539–546. Old High German forms are recorded as Walthari, Waltari, Walthar, Waltar, Waltere, Waldheri, Waldhere, Waltheri, Walthere, Walther, Walter, Waldher, and Valter. The Old English equivalent is Wealdhere, Old Norse has Valðar and  Valdarr.

The name entered the French language as Gauthier, Spanish as Gutierre, Portuguese as Gualter and Italian as Gualtiero. The modern Dutch form of the name is Wouter. The German name has also been adopted in a number of languages in the spelling Valter.

The Latinized form is Waltharius, the title of a poem of the late 9th or early 10th century on the legendary Gothic king Walter of Aquitaine. A fragmentary Old English poem on the same character is known as Waldere. Jacob Grimm in Teutonic Mythology speculates that Walthari, literally "wielder of hosts", may have been an epithet of the god of war, Ziu or Eor, and that the circumstance that the hero of the Waltharius poems loses his right hand in battle may be significant, linking him to the Norse tradition of Tyr.

Geographical distribution
As of 2014, 43.5% of all known bearers of the surname Walter were residents of Germany (frequency 1:643), 23.4% of the United States (1:5,374), 5.0% of Nigeria (1:12,307), 4.0% of France (1:5,814), 2.0% of Austria (1:1,467), 1.9% of England (1:10,157), 1.8% of Brazil (1:38,529), 1.6% of Australia (1:5,113), 1.4% of Angola (1:6,511), 1.3% of Canada (1:9,641), 1.3% of Switzerland (1:2,176), 1.2% of Ghana (1:7,682), 1.1% of Argentina (1:13,353), 1.0% of Poland (1:12,776) and 1.0% of South Africa (1:19,181).

In Germany, the frequency of the surname was higher than national average (1:643) in the following states:
 Baden-Württemberg (1:386)
 Bremen (1:422)
 Brandenburg (1:450)
 Hesse (1:526)
 Saxony-Anhalt (1:539)
 Rhineland-Palatinate (1:599)
 Thuringia (1:603)
 Bavaria (1:606)
 Saxony (1:621)
 Saarland (1:627)

Given name

Middle ages
 Walter the Englishman or Gualterus Anglicus, Anglo-Norman poet and scribe
 Walter, Count of Rethel (died 1262), French nobleman
 Walter (abbot of Evesham) or Walter de Cerisy (died 1104), English church leader
 Walter (archbishop of Sens), French church leader
 Walter, Bishop of Transylvania, Hungarian church leader
 Walter (bishop of Rochester) (died 1182), English church leader
 Walter (bishop of Wrocław), Episcopal Walloon
 Walter Bentley (died 1359), English knight who fought in the Hundred Years War
 Walter de Coutances (died 1207), Archbishop of Rouen and Chief Justiciar of England
 Walter von Cronberg (1477 or 1479–1543), 38th Grand Master of the Teutonic Order
 Walter fitz Alan, twelfth-century Scottish magnate and Steward of Scotland
 Walter fitz Gilbert of Cadzow, medieval Scottish nobleman
 Walter Tailboys (1350–1417), English landowner and politician

Modern era
 M. Walter F. Abeykoon (born 1903; died unknown), Inspector General of the Sri Lanka Police (1959–1963)
 Walter W. Arndt (1916–2011), German-American translator
 Walter Lewis Baily Jr. (1930–2013), American mathematician
 Wally Bayola (Walter James Bayola, born 1973), Filipino comedian and television personality
 Walter Bender (born 1956), president of One Laptop Per Child Software and Content
 Walter Bender (Canadian football) (born 1961), American football player
 W. O. Bentley (Walter Owen Bentley, 1889–1971), founder of Bentley Motors
 Walter Bentley (1849–1927), Scottish-Australian Shakespearean actor
 Walter Blackman (born c. 1965/1966), American politician 
 Walter Braithwaite (1865–1945), British army general 
 Walter Brennan (1894–1974), American actor
 Walter von Brockdorff-Ahlefeldt (1887–1943), German general during World War II
 Walter Cronkite (1916–2009), American journalist
 Walter Crucce (born 1974), Argentine boxer
 Walter Devaram (born 1939), Indian former Director General of Police of Tamil Nadu
 Walter Day (born 1949), American businessman, musician, and retired video game referee 
 Walter Percy Day (1878–1965), English matte artist and special effects technician 
 Walter Devereux, 1st Earl of Essex (1541–1576), English nobleman and general
 Walt Disney (Walter Elias Disney, 1901–1966), American film producer, animator and entrepreneur
 Walter Dorsey (1771–1823), justice of the Maryland Court of Appeals
 Walter Duranty (1884–1957), Anglo-American journalist
 Walter von Eberhardt (1862–1944), German military commander during World War I and Latvian War of Independence 
 Walter Eisfeld (1905–1940), German Nazi SS commandant of Sachsenhausen concentration camp
 Walter Feit (1930–2004), American mathematician
 Walter Fernando, Sri Lankan Sinhala air chief marshal, Commander of the Sri Lanka Air Force from 1986 to 1991
 Walter Forster, several people of the same name
 Walter Flanagan, host of the Tell 'Em Steve-Dave! podcast and star of AMC's Comic Book Men
 Walter Gericke (1907–1991), German Luftwaffe officer during World War II and a general in the Bundeswehr of West Germany
 Walter Godefroot (born 1943), Belgian road bicycle racer and cycling team manager
 Walter E. Gregory (1857-1918), American physician
 Walter Gretzky (1938–2021), Canadian cable repairman and father of Wayne Gretzky
 Steve Conway (born Walter James Groom, 1920–1952), British singer
 Walter Gropius (1883–1969), German architect
 Gunther (Walter Hahn, born 1987), Austrian professional wrestler
 Walter Hagen (1892–1969), American golfer
 Walter Hagen (aviator) (1897–1963), German general, aviator and Luftwaffe pilot during World War II
 Walter Heck, German graphic designer
 Walter Heitz (1878–1944), German general during World War II
 C. Walter Hodges (1909–2004), English artist and writer best known for illustrating children's books and for helping to recreate Elizabethan theatre
 Walter Jayawardena (born 1910; died unknown), Solicitor General of Sri Lanka (1967–1968)
 Walter Johnson (1887–1946), American baseball player
 Walter von Keudell (1884–1973), German forest expert and politician
 Walter Keane (1915–2000), American plagiarist, known for claiming MDH Keane's big-eyed waif paintings as his own
 Walter Kirn (born 1962), American author
 Walter Knott (1889-1981), American farmer
 Walter Koenig (born 1936), American actor
 Walter R. Kramer (1914–1995), US badminton champion
 Walter Kreye (born 1942), German actor
 Walter Lantz (1899–1994), American animator, cartoonist and film producer
 Walter Luchetti (born 1937), Italian politician
 Walter Lübcke (1953–2019), German politician 
 Walter Martos (born 1957), Peruvian retired military general and current prime minister of Peru
 Walter Matthau (1920–2000), American actor
 Walter Mazzarri (born 1961), Italian football manager
 Walter T. McCarthy (1898-1895), American lawyer and judge
 Walter R. McComas (1879–1922), American politician and lawyer
 Walter Mercado (1932–2019), Puerto Rican astrologer also known as Shanti Ananda
 Walter Mondale (1928–2021), American politician, Vice President of the United States (1977–1981) and 1984 Democratic Party presidential candidate
 Walter "Junie" Morrison (1954–2017), American funk musician, member of the Ohio Players
 Walter Andreas Müller (born 1945), Swiss actor and comedian
 Walter Murch (born 1943), American film editor and sound designer
 Walter Dean Myers (born Walter Milton Myers, 1937–2014), American author
 Walter Niephaus (1923–1992), German chess master
 Walter D. O'Hearn (1910–1969), Canadian journalist
 Walter Olkewicz (1948–2021), American actor
 Walter Ophey (1882–1930), German painter
 Walter Packer (born 1955), American football player
 Walter Palmore (born 1996), American football player
 Walter Payton (1953–1999), American football player
 Walter Pedraza (born 1981), Colombian road-cyclist
 Walter Pidgeon (1897–1984), Canadian actor
 Walter Piston (1894–1976), American composer
 Walter Poddubny (1960–2009), Canadian hockey player
 Walter Raleigh (c. 1552/1554–1618), English explorer 
 Walter Rauff (1906–1984), German Nazi SS colonel accused of directing the killing of hundreds of thousands of Jews in mobile gassing vans
 Walther Ritz (1878–1909), Swiss theoretical physicist
 Walter Röhrl (born 1947), German rally world champion
 Walter Romberg (1928–2014), German politician
 Walter Samuel (born 1978), Argentine footballer 
 Walter B. Sands (1870–1938), chief justice of the Montana Supreme Court
 Walter Schellenberg (1910–1952), German SS functionary during the Nazi era
 Walter Schreifels (born 1969), American musician
 Wally Schirra (1923–2007), American astronaut
 Walter Scott, several people of the same name
 Walter Scott (1771–1832), Scottish novelist and poet
 Walter Short (1880–1949), American lieutenant general responsible for US military installations in Hawaii at the time of the Japanese attack on Pearl Harbor
 Walter Sillers (1852–1931), American lawyer and planter
 Walter Sillers Jr. (1888–1966), American politician and white supremacist
 Walter Sisulu (1912–2003), South African politician
 Walter Smith (1948–2021), Scottish football player and manager
 Walter Bedell Smith (1895–1961), senior officer of the United States Army who served as chief of staff at Allied Forces Headquarters (AFHQ) during the Tunisia Campaign and the Allied invasion of Italy in 1943, during World War II
 Walter Shaw Sparrow (1862–1940), British writer on art and architecture
 Walter Stewart, several people of the same name
 Walter Tetley (1915–1975), American child actor
 Walter Tewksbury (1876–1968), American athlete
 Walter Thurnherr (born 1963), Swiss government official, Chancellor of Switzerland 
 Walter Ulbricht (1893–1973), German politician, leader of East Germany, 1950–71
 Walter Veltroni (born 1955), Italian writer, journalist and politician
 Walter Waalderbos (born 1951), Dutch footballer
 Walter Whitman (1819–1892), American poet, journalist, essayist and humanist
 Bruce Willis (Walter Bruce Willis, born 1955), American actor
 Walter Willison (born 1947), American actor, singer, writer, director and producer
 Walter Zapp (1905–2003), Baltic German inventor
 Walter E. Zink, US Army major general

Pseudonym 
 Walter Plinge, British theatre pseudonym used when the original actor's name is unknown or not wished to be included
 "Agent Walter", early codename of Josip Broz Tito
 Walter, pseudonym of the author of My Secret Life (erotic memoir)

Fictional and legendary characters 

 Walter of Aquitaine, a Visigoth king in Germanic heroic legend
 Walter, a character in the 2005 American science fiction adventure Zathura: A Space Adventure
 Walter, a synthetic android introduced in the 2017 Ridley Scott film Alien: Covenant
 Walter, a Muppet character introduced in the 2011 film The Muppets
 Walter, a puppet of ventriloquist Jeff Dunham (born 1962)
 Walter the Softy (real name Walter Brown), arch-enemy of Dennis the Menace from The Beano comic since 1953.
 Dr. Walter Bishop, a scientist on the 2008–2013 TV series Fringe
 Walter Blythe, a character in "Rainbow Valley" (1919), "Anne of Ingleside" (1939), and "Rilla of Ingleside" (1921)
 Walter Donovan, the main antagonist of the 1989 film Indiana Jones and the Last Crusade
 Walter C. Dornez, a character from the anime/manga series Hellsing
Walter Clements, Internet Meme of a white bull terrier (real name Nelson)
 Walter E. Kurtz, the main antagonist of the 1979 film Apocalypse Now
 Dr. Walter Jenning, a character in the 1986 American science fiction movie Howard the Duck
 Walter Joseph Kovacs, the secret identity of the vigilante "Rorschach" in Watchmen since 1968
 Walter Longmire, the title character in Craig Johnson's A Longmire Mystery Series and main protagonist of A&E and Netflix's LONGMIRE television series
 Walter Mitty, the title character in James Thurber's 1939 short story The Secret Life of Walter Mitty
 Walter Nichols, a character in the Nickelodeon sitcom Drake & Josh
 Walter Newell, secret identity of Stingray (comics), a Marvel Comics character since 1967
 Corporal Walter Eugine "Radar" O’Reilly, from the 1968–1986 M*A*S*H franchise
 Walter Peck, a character in the 1984 American supernatural comedy movie Ghostbusters
 Walter Powell, a character in the American sitcom television series Charles in Charge
 Walter Smith, a character in the Nintendo video game Ninja Gaiden
 Walter Sobchak, Vietnam veteran and best friend of "The Dude" in the Coen Brothers' 1998 film The Big Lebowski
 Walter White, the protagonist of the 2008–2013 TV series Breaking Bad

Surname

Medieval 
Walter, or FitzWalter, an armigerous family in Norman England
Theobald Walter, 1st Chief Butler of Ireland
Hubert Walter (c. 1160 – 13 July 1205), English archbishop and justiciar

Early modern 
Johann Walter (1496–1570), German composer and poet
Thomas Walter (botanist) (1740–1789), British-born American botanist
Anton Walter (1752–1826), German piano maker
Ignaz Walter (1755–1822), Austrian opera singer and composer

Modern 
Andrew Walter (born 1982), American football quarterback
Ben Walter (born 1984), Canadian ice hockey player
Bianca Walter (born 1990), German short track speed skater
Bruno Walter (1876–1962), German-American conductor and composer
Carl Walter (c. 1831–1907), German-Australian botanist and photographer
David Walter (disambiguation), several people
Eleanor Walter (1910–1997), American painter
Emma Walter (1833/34–1893), British artist
Eugene Walter (1921–1998), American writer and actor
Francis E. Walter (1894–1963), American politician
Fritz Walter (football executive) (1900–1981), German football executive
Fritz Walter (footballer born 1960), German footballer
Fritz Walter (politician) (1896–1977), German politician
Fritz Walter (1920–2002), German footballer
Harriet Walter (born 1950), British actress
Harvey Washington Walter (1819-1878), American lawyer and railroad business executive
Hellmuth Walter (1900–1980), German engineer
Howard Arnold Walter (1883–1918), American Congregationalist minister, author, and hymn writer
Hubert Walter (1930 — 2008), German anthropologist 
Jamie Campbell-Walter (born 1972), British professional racing driver
Jean Walter (1883–1957), French architect
Jessica Walter (1941–2021), American actress
Joachim Walter (born 1940), East German football player
Joe Walter (American football) (born 1963), American football tackle
Joe Walter (footballer) (1895–1995), British football player
Joe Walter (Ohio politician) (born 1947), former member of the Ohio House of Representatives
Joseph Walter (1783–1856), British marine artist
Kevin Walter (born 1981), American football wide receiver
Ottmar Walter (1924–2013), German footballer
Otto F. Walter (1928–1994) Swiss journalist, author and publisher
Owen Walter (born 1979), Canadian ice hockey defenceman
Raymond Walter (born 1972), American politician, New York State Assemblyman
Rita Walter (1931-2020), American actress
Ruedi Walter, (1916–1990) Swiss comedian and actor
Ryan Walter (born 1958), Canadian hockey player
Silja Walter (1919–2011) Swiss author and Benedictine nun
Thomas U. Walter (1804–1887), American architect
Tracey Walter (born 1947), American character actor
Ulrich Walter (born 1954), German astronaut
Young Singleton Walter (1811-1883), American politician

See also
Valter
Vladimir (name)
Wallace (disambiguation)
Walther
Wally (disambiguation),
Walt, name
Walters (disambiguation)
Wat (disambiguation)
Walker, unrelated but has a similar spelling 
Waldemar (disambiguation)

References

Germanic given names
English masculine given names
Scottish masculine given names
German masculine given names
Dutch masculine given names
Norwegian masculine given names
Swedish masculine given names
Danish masculine given names
German-language surnames
Surnames from given names